"She's Lying" is a song written by Jan Crutchfield, and recorded by American country music artist Lee Greenwood.  It was released in August 1982 as the third single from the album Inside Out.  The song reached #7 on the Billboard Hot Country Singles & Tracks chart.

Chart performance

References

1982 singles
Lee Greenwood songs
MCA Records singles
Song recordings produced by Jerry Crutchfield
Songs written by Jan Crutchfield
1982 songs